Geoffrey Derek West (27 May 1922 – October 2002) was a British academic specialising in Medieval French and Arthurian literature, on which he authored two books and numerous articles. He also took a professional interest in American frontier and military history. He was a professor and dean at McMaster University, Ontario, for seventeen years, before returning to England, where he spent his retirement watching and writing about cricket. He authored numerous books and articles on the game, compiled a number of indices, and also acted as a consultant cricket historian.

References 

 West, G. Derek. Twelve Days of Grace. London: Darf, 1989.

1922 births
2002 deaths
Academic staff of McMaster University
Cricket historians and writers
British sportswriters
20th-century British historians
British expatriates in Canada